Hamilton Historic District is a national historic district located at Hamilton, Martin County, North Carolina.  The district encompasses 60 contributing buildings, 2 contributing sites, and 1 contributing structure in the town of Hamilton.  They include notable examples of Greek Revival, Queen Anne, and Carpenter Gothic architecture in buildings dated from the early-19th century through the 1920s.  Located in the district is the separately listed Darden Hotel. Other notable buildings include the Edmondson-Purvis House, Upton-Pippen house, Conoho Masonic Lodge, Weatherbee-Anthony House, David L. Martin House (c. 1879), Baker-Ballard House, St. Martin's Episcopal Church, Gladstone Building, Hamilton Methodist Church (1903), and Hamilton Baptist Church (1929).

It was listed on the National Register of Historic Places in 1980.

References

Historic districts on the National Register of Historic Places in North Carolina
Greek Revival architecture in North Carolina
Queen Anne architecture in North Carolina
Buildings and structures in Martin County, North Carolina
National Register of Historic Places in Martin County, North Carolina